Calama may refer to the following places and jurisdictions :

Calama (Numidia), an ancient city and former bishopric in the Roman province of Numidia, now a Latin Catholic titular see
Guelma, a city in Algeria, the successor of ancient Calama
Calama, Chile
Kalama, Washington, United States